Best Days in the Sun is a promotional album by Feeder, released on a limited basis in Japan only, in 2001. It was the band's first compilation album, containing all of their singles, plus some album tracks, from the band's then three studio albums, Echo Park, Yesterday Went Too Soon, Polythene, as well as their EP Swim.

The album was released in early 2001, in order to promote the release of Echo Park. It is said to be "possibly the rarest Feeder item out there". This can be however argued with, as a white label 12" of 2001 hit single "Buck Rogers", is limited to an even smaller number of copies, and a 1994 demo tape when the band were called "Real", only has one copy in known existence.

Track listing 
Seven Days in the Sun
Just a Day
Turn
Buck Rogers
Satellite News
Paperfaces (UK single mix)
Yesterday Went Too Soon
Insomnia
Day In Day Out
You're My Evergreen
Suffocate (UK single mix)
High
Crash (radio mix)
Cement
Tangerine
Stereo World
My Perfect Day
Swim
Seven Days in the Sun (radio edit)

Feeder albums
2001 compilation albums
Promotional albums